Burg (Dillkr) Nord station is a railway station in the municipality of Burg, located in the Lahn-Dill-Kreis district in Hesse, Germany.

References

Railway stations in Hesse
Buildings and structures in Lahn-Dill-Kreis